Porto Velho Esporte Clube, commonly referred to as Porto Velho, is a Brazilian football club based in Porto Velho, Rondônia. The club competes in the Campeonato Rondoniense Série A, the top division in the Rondônia state football league system.

As of 2022, Porto Velho is the second-best ranked team from Rondônia in CBF's national club ranking, being placed 131st overall.

History
Originally founded on 28 September 2014 under the name of 14 Bis, the club became a professional side on 23 April 2018, now called Porto Velho EC, and subsequently affiliated to the Federação Rondoniense de Futebol.

Their first professional tournament was the 2019 Campeonato Rondoniense, which the club reached the semifinals. In the following year, they won the Rondoniense and qualified to the 2021 Campeonato Brasileiro Série D, 2021 Copa Verde and the 2021 Copa do Brasil.

Honours
 Campeonato Rondoniense
 Winners (2): 2020, 2021

References

External links
  
  

2018 establishments in Brazil
Association football clubs established in 2018
Football clubs in Rondônia